Yusuf Kamil Pasha (1808, Arapgir – 1876, Constantinople) was an Ottoman statesman and Grand Vizier of the Ottoman Empire during the reign of Sultan Abdülaziz.

Life and career

Yusuf Kamil was born in the Anatolian city of Arapgir, and belonged to the Gökbeyi family of the Aq Qoyunlu tribe. His father, Ismâil Beyzâde Mehmed Bey, died when he was young, and he was raised by his uncle Gümrükçü Osman Pasha. While Osman Pasha served as the governor of the sanjaks of Kayseri and Bozok in Ankara Eyalet, Yusuf Kamil was educated by private tutors, but finished his education in Istanbul after his uncle was recalled to the capital. In 1829, after completing his education, Yusuf Kamil entered government service, and worked as a scribe for the Imperial Divan for four years.

In Egypt
In 1833, Yusuf Kamil left Istanbul for Egypt. According to rumor, Yusuf Kamil had a dream, and was told that his fortune would be waiting for him if he travelled there. After entering the service of Mehmed Ali Pasha, he eventually worked his way up in the court, and eventually married Mehmed Ali's daughter, Zeynep Hanim. In 1845, Mehmed Ali Pasha sent Yusuf Kamil on a mission as the Egyptian envoy to the wedding of Mahmud II's daughter Adile Sultan to Damat Mehmed Ali Pasha. He travelled to Istanbul with lavish gifts and tribute. In recognition of his role, the Sultan granted Yusuf Kamil the title Mîr-i Mîrân, equivalent to the rank of beylerbey.

Mehmed Ali died in 1849, and was succeeded by his son Abbas Hilmi Pasha, who assigned Yusuf Kamil to a mission to Sudan, which he refused, resulting in his exile to Aswan. For his insubordination, he was stripped of his titles and his properties, and forced to divorce his wife Zeynep Hanim. While in prison, Yusuf Kamil undertook the translation of François Fénelon's Les Aventures de Télémaque into Turkish. After several months of captivity in exile, and many letters written to the Sultan and to the Grand Vizier Mustafa Reşid Pasha, Yusuf Kamil was finally released, and was permitted to travel to Istanbul, where he was reunited with his wife.

Return to Istanbul
After his return to Istanbul, Kamil Pasha was named to the Supreme Council of Judicial Ordinance, a predecessor to the first Ottoman Parliament.

At a Council of Ministers meeting held at the mansion of Kamil Pasha, concerns were raised about the Eyptian governor Said Pasha's granting of the Suez Canal concession to France, on the grounds that it would increase foreign interference in Egypt, and it was decided that Kamil Pasha would write a letter to the Pasha, who was his brother-in-law, to request that he cancel the concession. Unfortunately, this letter fell into the hands of Vincent, Count Benedetti, the French Ambassador, who complained to the Sultan, and Mustafa Reşid Pasha and Kamil Pasha were both relieved of their positions in the government. Despite this, Kamil Pasha was re-appointed to the Supreme Council of Judicial Ordinance less than a year later. In the same year, Kamil Pasha was given the Order of Distinction by Sultan Abdulmejid I.

In 1857, Kamil Pasha and Reshid Pasha travelled to Egypt to represent the sultan at Said Pasha's son's circumcision. After their return to Istanbul, Reshid Pasha was made Grand Vizier, and Kamil Pasha was appointed the chief of the  once again. After the accession of Abdulaziz to the throne, Kamil Pasha returned to Egypt, whence he embarked on a journey to Mecca and Medina with his brother-in-law Said Pasha. For his long service to the Empire and the Ottoman State, Abdulaziz awarded Kamil Pasha with the Order of Osmanieh shortly after becoming sultan.

Awards
 Order of Distinction (1855)
 Order of Osmanieh (1861)

References 

1808 births
1876 deaths
19th-century Grand Viziers of the Ottoman Empire